This is a list of the dynasties that ruled the Roman Empire and its two succeeding counterparts, the Western Roman Empire and the Eastern Roman Empire. Dynasties of states that had claimed legal succession from the Roman Empire are not included in this list.

List of Roman dynasties

Graphical representation

See also

 Dynasty
 History of the Byzantine Empire
 History of the Roman Empire
 List of Byzantine emperors
 List of Byzantine usurpers
 List of condemned Roman emperors
 List of Roman emperors
 List of Roman usurpers
 Pax Romana
 Succession of the Roman Empire

Notes

References

Roman